Lepidopleurus fairchildi is a species of chiton in the family Leptochitonidae.

Distribution
This species is endemic to Australia's Macquarie Island in the Southern Ocean south of New Zealand.

Habitat
This chiton lives on intertidal rocks.

References

Leptochitonidae
Molluscs described in 1929